The third women's race of Gent–Wevelgem was a one-day women's cycle race held in Belgium on 30 March 2014. The race was rated as an UCI rating of 1.2. The race was won by the American rider, Lauren Hall.

Results

See also
 2014 in women's road cycling

References

Gent-Wevelgem Women's race
Gent-Wevelgem Women's race
Women's road bicycle races
Gent–Wevelgem